Cyclonic Storm Roanu was a relatively weak tropical cyclone that caused severe flooding in Sri Lanka and Bangladesh during May 2016. It is the first tropical cyclone of the annual cyclone season. Roanu originated from a low-pressure area that formed south of Sri Lanka, which gradually drifted north and intensified into a cyclonic storm on 19 May. However, wind shear and land interaction caused it to weaken slightly, before reintensifying as it accelerated towards the coast of Bangladesh.

The storm was responsible for 201 deaths in Sri Lanka and another 26 deaths in Bangladesh. Damage throughout Sri Lanka reached US$2 billion. Roanu also brought torrential rainfall to the Indian states of Tamil Nadu, Andhra Pradesh, Kerala and Odisha as it drifted in a generally northeastward direction, close to the coast.

Meteorological history

Under the influence of a trough, a low-pressure area formed over the Bay of Bengal on 14 May. It slowly consolidated as it paralleled the east coast of Sri Lanka, prompting the India Meteorological Department (IMD) to classify it as a depression on 17 May. Late the same day, the Joint Typhoon Warning Center (JTWC) issued a Tropical Cyclone Formation Alert (TCFA), soon after which the JTWC upgraded the system to a tropical storm. Simultaneously, the IMD upgraded the storm to a Deep Depression, prompting the issuance of cyclone warnings for the states of Andhra Pradesh and Odisha. On 19 May, the IMD reported that the storm had reached cyclonic storm intensity, and assigned it the name Roanu.

At the time, Roanu was tracking slowly northward along the northern periphery of a subtropical ridge located over the Malay Peninsula. Despite favorable outflow and warm sea surface temperatures (SSTs) reaching , its proximity to land and moderate vertical wind shear kept the storm from intensifying rapidly. The diurnal temperature variation over land and the persistent wind shear began to affect the deep convection obscuring the low-level circulation center (LLCC). In the late hours of that day, Roanu showed a weakening trend after most of the convection covering the LLCC was sheared off. However, the wind shear soon decreased, and the storm reestablished deep convection over and around the LLCC, forming a central dense overcast in a period of 6 hours. SSMIS imagery revealed tightly curved rainbands wrapped into the LLCC. On 21 May, Roanu made landfall just northwest of Chittagong, Bangladesh.

Preparations and impact

Sri Lanka

Preparations for the storm began even before the IMD started tracking it as a depression. As the area of low pressure tracked closer to the country, the Meteorology Department of Sri Lanka issued a warning on 13 May stating that the disturbance would affect the country. Fishermen were advised to be vigilant. Later, The National Building Research Organisation (NBRO) issued landslide warning in the districts of Badulla, Monaragala, Kandy, Ratnapura, Kurunegala, Nuwara Eliya, Kegalle and Matale. President Maithripala Sirisena instructed the local authorities to provide relief to those affected by the system. The Minister Of Disaster Management, Defense Secretary, Tri Forces' Commanders and the Inspector General Of Police were instructed to undertake the operation.

Sri Lankan Disaster Management Centre (DMC) issued a flood alert on 16 May as the low-pressure area brought heavy rains to the country. The Kelani River and Maha Oya swelled as a result of the rainfall. The depression brought torrential rains to Sri Lanka, causing flash flooding and landslides, resulting in 37 deaths. Additionally, the storm displaced over 134,000 people. By 26 May, the death toll had risen to 104, while 99 people had been reported missing. The Sri Lankan Disaster Management Centre said that areas of the nation received the highest amount of rainfall since 2010. Landslides buried three villages in Kegalle District.

Damage throughout Sri Lanka reached US$2 billion.

India

Kelambakkam, Chennai, received 226 mm of rainfall on 19 May. Later reports indicated that the city had received the highest rainfall in the month of May in over 2 decades. 12,000 personnel were deployed in the city to aid rescue operations. Multiple boats were stationed around the city for emergency rescue. In the low-lying areas, the National Disaster Response Force positioned 4 teams of personnel. An emergency number (1070) was set up. The IMD put the states of Andhra Pradesh and Odisha on an orange alert (the second highest level of emergency in India) on 19 May. The city of Kakinada recorded  of rain in a day, the highest reported in the past 10 years. Bapatla reported  of rain. Chief Minister of Andhra Pradesh N. Chandrababu Naidu positioned 5 teams, each consisting of 100 personnel, in Krishna, East Godavari and Visakhapatnam districts.

Under the influence of the system, various places in Odisha received moderate to heavy rainfall. Chief Minister of Odisha Naveen Patnaik readied 10 teams of Odisha Disaster Rapid Action Force and fire service personnel. Government of Odisha issued an alert in at least 12 districts in coastal, southern and northern regions of the state. In West Bengal, Digha received  of rainfall and Sagar Island received  as the cyclone inched closer.

Bangladesh

Before the cyclone made landfall, over half a million people had been taken into shelters by the Government of Bangladesh. All flights at Shah Amanat International Airport were suspended. Restrictions were imposed on the movement of ships and ferries by Bangladesh Inland Water Transport Authority.

A storm surge up to 7 ft (2.0 m) above the astronomical tide hit the coast of Bangladesh at afternoon.
The cyclone approached the land over the coast at Sandwip, Hatia, Kutubdia, Sitakundu and Feni. The cyclone caused at least 26 deaths in seven districts across the country. 30 people died when Roanu hit the county, most of them died when the cyclone's storm surge overtopped dams. Around 40,000 homesteads and business houses were damaged.

The storm disrupted electricity supply and road communications in the areas. Food storage, seasonal crops were damaged. Livestock, including fish and shrimp firms were swept away. Damage across the nation were estimated at ৳10 billion (US$127 million).

Aftermath

Sri Lanka
Rescue operations began soon after the storm, on 18 May, with Sri Lankan military personnel searching for missing people in rural areas. 115 soldiers reportedly searched the villages buried by the landslides in attempt to find any survivors. At least 50 people were rescued from the hardest-hit areas in the Kegalle District. However, another spell of heavy rain on 19 May disrupted the operations. Major General Sudantha Ranasinghe, the officer in charge of the rescue operation, later told that the authorities had begun to give up the rescue operations. The death toll was confirmed to be 58. By the evening of 19 May, rescuers feared that the remaining 134 people missing were dead. Australian Minister for Foreign Affairs Julie Bishop pledged assistance to Sri Lanka, saying "The Australian Government stands ready to provide any assistance that our Sri Lankan friends may require in responding to this disaster." Pakistan's Government also sent field hospital and relief materials. As the search operations resumed that day, rescuers continued recovering bodies of those buried in the landslides which also reportedly destroyed 66 houses in Elangapitiya. 200,000 people had to escape from the low-lying areas of Colombo on rubber dinghies and makeshift rafts. A total of 101 deaths and 100 missing persons have been reported. The Sri Lanka national cricket team donated  to the victims of Roanu.

See also

 Cyclone Bijli
 Cyclone Laila
 Cyclone Viyaru
 Cyclone Fani

Notes

References

External links

 01B.ROANU  from the U.S. Naval Research Laboratory

2016 in Bangladesh
2016 disasters in India
2016 in Sri Lanka
2016 North Indian Ocean cyclone season
Cyclonic storms
Tropical cyclones in Bangladesh
Tropical cyclones in India
Tropical cyclones in Sri Lanka
May 2016 events
Tropical cyclones in 2016